The 1962 NCAA University Division baseball season, play of college baseball in the United States organized by the National Collegiate Athletic Association (NCAA) began in the spring of 1962.  The season progressed through the regular season and concluded with the 1962 College World Series.  The College World Series, held for the sixteenth time in 1962, consisted of one team from each of eight geographical districts and was held in Omaha, Nebraska at Johnny Rosenblatt Stadium as a double-elimination tournament.  Michigan claimed the championship.

Conference winners
This is a partial list of conference champions from the 1962 season.  Each of the eight geographical districts chose, by various methods, the team that would represent them in the NCAA Tournament.  8 teams earned automatic bids by winning their conference championship while 19 teams earned at-large selections.

Conference standings
The following is an incomplete list of conference standings:

College World Series

The 1962 season marked the sixteenth NCAA Baseball Tournament, which culminated with the eight team College World Series.  The College World Series was held in Omaha, Nebraska.  The eight teams played a double-elimination format, with Michigan claiming their second championship with a 5–4, fifteen-inning win over Santa Clara in the final.

Award winners

All-America team

References